Ana Paula Nórbio Padua Ribeiro (born ) is a Brazilian group rhythmic gymnast. She represents her nation at international competitions. She competed at world championships, including at the 2015  World Rhythmic Gymnastics Championships.

References

1989 births
Living people
Brazilian rhythmic gymnasts
Place of birth missing (living people)
Gymnasts at the 2015 Pan American Games
Pan American Games gold medalists for Brazil
Pan American Games silver medalists for Brazil
Pan American Games medalists in gymnastics
South American Games gold medalists for Brazil
South American Games silver medalists for Brazil
South American Games bronze medalists for Brazil
South American Games medalists in gymnastics
Competitors at the 2006 South American Games
Competitors at the 2010 South American Games
Medalists at the 2015 Pan American Games
20th-century Brazilian women
21st-century Brazilian women